Denbigh Hall railway station was a temporary terminus station on the London and Birmingham Railway in the Denbigh area of what is now Milton Keynes in Buckinghamshire, England. It was open for less than six months, between April and September 1838.

History
The route of the London and Birmingham Railway was designed and engineered by Robert Stephenson. Work on this tunnel was prolonged, due to the builders unexpectedly encountering quicksand, and the route was not ready for the scheduled opening of the railway on 9 April 1838. Denbigh Hall station was named after a nearby inn on Watling Street, dating from 1710. The bridge over Watling Street still survives, but has been extended as the railway has widened.

The station closed with the opening of Kilsby Tunnel on 17 September 1838, though the line still exists, forming part of the West Coast Main Line from London to Glasgow.

Due to the temporary nature of the station, no images of it or records of its layout are known to exist, but a contemporary engraving by George Dodgson Callow and William Radclyffe shows a train on the bridge in its immediate vicinity.

Commemoration

In 1920, Herbert Leon, 1st baronet of the nearby Bletchley Park, commissioned a plaque on the bridge to commemorate the station. The plaque reads:

Service summary

See also

1838 in rail transport

Notes

References

Bibliography

Disused railway stations in Buckinghamshire
Former London and Birmingham Railway stations
Railway stations in Great Britain opened in 1838
Railway stations in Great Britain closed in 1838
Railway stations in Milton Keynes